The Unborn 2 is a 1994 American horror film directed by Rick Jacobson, and a sequel to the 1991 film The Unborn.

Plot
A fertility experiment gone awry has created at least several disfigured children with extremely high IQs. A woman who had the treatment is making it her mission to kill the mutants one by one before they destroy mankind. One mutant child's mother is trying to save her own deformed child from the pursuer, but the baby leaves a path of destruction in its wake.

Cast
 Michele Greene as Catherine Moore 
 Robin Curtis as Linda Holt 
 Scott Valentine as John Edson 
 Darryl Henriques as Artie Philips 
 Carole Ita White as Marge Philips 
 Brittney Powell as Sally Anne Philips 
 Leonard O. Turner as Lieutenant Briggs
 Anneliza Scott as Officer Craig

Reception
In 2011, author John Kenneth Muir wrote that, "This action-packed sequel to The Unborn has some real momentum going for it, but not a whole lot more", concluding, "One thing's for sure: The Unborn 2 isn't boring. Silly and dopey at times, yes, but certainly not boring."

Home media
The Unborn 2 was released on home video in July 1994.

References

External links
 

1994 films
1994 horror films
Films produced by Roger Corman
1990s English-language films
Films directed by Rick Jacobson